Dr. Natalie Matosin is an Australian scientist known for research into the impacts of stress and its role in mental illness. Matosin's research has been published in prestigious academic journals, as well as on The Conversation. Matosin spoke at TEDx Hamburg in June 2017 and is the 2021 Al & Val Rosenstrauss Fellow. She was previously a National Health and Medical Research Council CJ Martin Early Career Research Fellow, and Alexander von Humboldt Fellow.

Early life and education 
Matosin was interested in science and curing the world of disease from an early age and went on to study a Bachelor of Medical Science at university. Matosin was awarded a PhD from the University of Wollongong with a thesis "Exploring mGluR5 dysregulation in schizophrenia: from gene to protein".  She went on to hold a postdoc position at UNSW.

Career and research 
Matosin works at the University of Wollongong and the Max Planck Institute of Psychiatry in Germany. The focus of Matosin's research has been on the physical and chemical clues that remain in brain tissue following the effects of stress over a lifetime. Matosin analyses postmortem brain samples in order to compare the brains of those diagnosed with brain disorders with the brains of healthy donors. 

Matosin was working in Germany during the arrival of large numbers of Syrian refugees, and her research now includes study into the impact of trauma on refugee populations in the Illawarra community, examining its impact on the body's physiology at a molecular level and its relationship to mental illness.

Publication
Her most cited articles are:
Natalie Matosin, Elisabeth Frank, Martin Engel, Jeremy Lum, and Kelly Newell "Negativity towards negative results: a discussion of the disconnect between scientific worth and scientific culture." Disease Models & Mechanisms (2014) 7, 171-173 doi:10.1242/dmm.015123
Natalie Matosin, Thorhildur Halldorsdottir, Elisabeth B Binder. "Understanding the molecular mechanisms underpinning gene by environment interactions in psychiatric disorders: the FKBP5 model." Biological Psychiatry (2018) 83 (10), 821-830 
Matosin N, Newell KA. Metabotropic glutamate receptor 5 in the pathology and treatment of schizophrenia. Neuroscience & Biobehavioral Reviews. 2013 Mar 1;37(3):256-68.
Publications from her independent research group include:

 Dominic Kaul, Sybille G Schwab, Naguib Mechawar, Lezanne Ooi, Natalie Matosin "Alterations in Astrocytic Regulation of Excitation and Inhibition by Stress Exposure and in Severe Psychopathology". Journal of Neuroscience (2022) 42 (36), 6823-6834
 Dominic Kaul, Sybille G Schwab, Naguib Mechawar, Natalie Matosin "How Stress Physically Re-shapes the Brain: Impact on Brain Cell Shapes, Numbers and Connections in Psychiatric Disorders". Neuroscience and Biobehavioural Reviews (2021) 124, 193-215
 Rachael Bartlett , Zoltan Sarnyai, Shakeh Momartin, Lezanne Ooi, Sibylle G Schwab, Natalie Matosin. Understanding the pathology of psychiatric disorders in refugees. Psychiatry Research (2021) 296, 113661
 Dominic Kaul, Caine C Smith, Julia Stevens, Anna S Fröhlich, Elisabeth B Binder, Naguib Mechawar, Sibylle G Schwab, Natalie Matosin. Severe childhood and adulthood stress associates with neocortical layer-specific reductions of mature spines in psychiatric disorders. Neurobiology of Stress (2020) 13, 100270

Recognition and awards 

 2021 Al & Val Rosenstrauss Fellowship from the Rebecca L Cooper Medical Research Foundation.
 2020 Brain Sciences Award from the Rebecca L Cooper Medical Research Foundation.
 2020 Rebecca L Cooper Memorial Award from the Rebecca L Cooper Medical Research Foundation.
 2020 World Congress of Psychiatric Genetics Award.
 2019 NSW Tall Poppy Science Award from the Australian Institute of Policy and Science.
2019 Dame Bridget Ogilvie Career Advancement Scholarship.
2017 TEDx Speaker, TEDx Hamburg 
2017 place on Forbes 30 Under 30 list in the category Europe - Science & Healthcare.
2017 Alies Muskin Career Development Award, Anxiety and Depression Association of America.
2017 ACNP Travel Award, American College of Neuropsychopharmacology.
2016 NHMRC CJ Martin Early Career Fellowship, Australian National Health and Medical Research Council.
2015 Humboldt Research Fellow, Alexander Von Humboldt Foundation.
2013 Company of Biologists Travelling Fellowship.
2012 Ian Scott Scholarship from Australian Rotary Health.

References

External links 

 ABC Illawarra radio interview (Soundcloud)
 TEDx Hamburg talk (YouTube)

Academic staff of the University of Wollongong
Living people
Year of birth missing (living people)
Neuroscience
Australian women neuroscientists
Australian neuroscientists
Australian women scientists